This is a list of state maintained primary schools in Northern Ireland.



A
Abbey Primary School, Newtownards, County Down
Abbots Cross Primary School, Newtownabbey, County Antrim
Abercorn Primary School, Banbridge, County Down
Academy Primary School, Saintfield, County Down
Acorn Integrated Primary School, Carrickfergus, County Antrim
Aghadrumsee Primary School, Rosslea, County Fermanagh
Aghavilly Primary School, Milford, County Armagh
Alexander Dickson Primary School, Ballygowan, County Down
All Children's Primary School, Newcastle, County Down
All Saints' Primary School, Ballela, County Down
All Saints' Primary School, Ballymena, County Antrim
Altayeskey Primary School, Draperstown, County Londonderry
Ampertaine Primary School, Upperlands, County Londonderry
Anahorish Primary School, Toome, County Antrim
Anamar Primary School, Crossmaglen, County Armagh
Anahilt Primary School, Hillsborough, County Down
Andrews Memorial Primary School, Comber, County Down
Annaghmore Primary School, Annaghmore, County Armagh
Annalong Primary School, Annalong, County Down
Annsborough Integrated Primary School, Castlewellan, County Down
Antiville Primary School, Larne, County Antrim
Antrim Primary School, Antrim
Ardmore Primary School, Derryadd, County Armagh
Armoy Primary School, Armoy, County Antrim
Armstrong Primary School, Armagh
Ashgrove Primary School, Carnmoney, County Antrim
Aughamullan Primary School, Dungannon, County Tyrone
Augher Central Primary School, Augher, County Tyrone
Aughnacloy Primary School, Aughnacloy, County Tyrone
Avoniel Primary School, Belfast, County Antrim

B

Ballinderry Primary School, Upper Ballinderry, County Antrim
Ballycarry Primary School, Ballycarry, County Antrim
Ballycastle Primary School, Ballycastle, County Antrim
Ballycarrickmaddy Primary School, Lisburn, County Antrim
Ballyclare Primary School, Ballyclare, County Antrim
Ballycraigy Primary School, Ballycraigy, County Antrim
Ballydown Primary School, Banbridge, County Down
Ballygawley Primary School, Ballygawley, County Tyrone
Ballyhackett Primary School, Castlerock, County Londonderry
Ballyhenry Primary School, Newtownabbey, County Antrim
Ballyholland Primary School, Newry, County Down
Ballyholme Primary School, Bangor, County Down
Ballylifford Primary School, Cookstown, County Tyrone
Ballykeel Primary School, Ballymena, County Antrim
Ballykelly Primary School, Ballykelly, County Londonderry
Ballymacash Primary School, Ballymacash, County Antrim
Ballymagee Primary School, Bangor, County Down
Ballymena Primary School, Ballymena, County Antrim
Ballymoney Primary School, Ballymoney, County Antrim
Ballynahinch Primary School, Ballynahinch, County Down
Ballynease Primary School, Portglenone, County Antrim
Ballynure Primary School, Ballynure, County Antrim
Ballyoran Primary School, Portadown, County Armagh
Ballyrock Primary School, Bushmills, County Antrim
Ballysally Primary School, Ballysally, County Londonderry
Ballysillan Primary School, Belfast, County Antrim
Ballytober Primary School, Bushmills, County Antrim
Ballytrea Primary School, Stewartstown, County Tyrone
Ballyvester Primary School, Donaghadee, County Down
Ballywalter Primary School, Ballywalter, County Down
Balnamore Primary School, Balnamore, County Antrim
Bangor Central Integrated Primary School, Bangor, County Down
Barnish Primary School, Ballyvoy, County Antrim
Bellaghy Primary School, Bellaghy, County Londonderry
Belmont Primary School, Belfast, County Antrim
Belvoir Park Primary School, Belvoir, County Down
Bessbrook Primary School, Bessbrook, County Armagh
Birches Primary School, the Birches, County Armagh
Black Mountain raniel Primary School, Belfast, County Antrim
Bleary Primary School, Bleary, County Armagh
Bloomfield Primary School, Bangor, County Down
Blythefield Primary School, Belfast, County Antrim
Bocombra Primary School, Portadown, County Armagh
Botanic Primary School, Belfast, County Antrim
Brackenagh West Primary School, Kilkeel, County Down
Braid Primary School, Broughshane, County Antrim
Braidside Primary School, Ballymena, County Antrim
Braniel Primary School, Belfast, County Antrim
Bready Jubilee Primary School, Strabane, County Tyrone
Bridge Primary School, Banbridge, County Down
Broadbridge Primary School, Eglinton, County Londonderry
Bronte Primary School, Banbridge, County Down
Brooklands Primary School, Dundonald, County Down
Broughshane Primary School, Broughshane, County Antrim
Brownlee Primary School, Lisburn, County Antrim
Buick Primary School, Cullybackey, County Antrim
Bunscoil an Chaistil, Ballycastle, County Antrim
Bunscoil an Iúir, Newry, County Down
Bunscoil an Traonaigh, Lisnaskea, County Fermanagh
Bunscoil an tSléibhe Dhuibh, Belfast
Bunscoil Ard Mhacha, County Armagh
Bunscoil Bheann Mhadagáin, Belfast
Bunscoil Cholmcille, County Londonderry
Bunscoil Eoin Baiste, Portadown, County Armagh
Bunscoil Mhic Reachtain, Belfast
Bunscoil Naomh Bríd, Maghera, County Londonderry
Bunscoil Naomh Cainneach, Dungiven, County Londonderry
Bunscoil Naomh Cholmcille, Carrickmore, County Tyrone
Bunscoil Naomh Pádraig, Downpatrick, County Down
Bunscoil Naomh Proinsias, Lurgan, County Armagh
Bunscoil Phobal Feirste, Belfast
Bushmills Primary School, Bushmills, County Antrim
Bush Primary School, Dungannon, County Tyrone

C
Cabin Hill Preparatory School, Belfast
Cairncastle Primary School, Cairncastle, County Antrim
Cainshill Primary School. Belfast, County Down
Camphill Primary School, Ballymena, County Antrim
Cavehill Primary School, Belfast, County Antrim
Carhill Primary School, Garvagh, County Londonderry
Carlane Primary School, Toome, County Antrim
Carnaghts Primary School, Shankbridge, County Antrim
Carnalbanagh Primary School, Glenarm, County Antrim
Carnalridge Primary School, Portrush, County Antrim
Carniny Primary School, Ballymena, County Antrim
Carnlough Primary School, Carnlough, County Antrim
Carnmoney Primary School, Newtownabbey, County Antrim
Carntall Primary School, Clogher, County Tyrone
Carr Primary School, Lisburn, County Down
Carr's Glen Primary School, Belfast, County Antrim
Carrickfergus Central Primary School, Carrickfergus, County Antrim
Carrickfergus Model Primary School, Carrickfergus, County Antrim
Carrickmannon Primary School, Newtownards, County Down
Carrick Primary School, Lurgan, Lurgan, County Armagh
Carrick Primary School, Warrenpoint, Warrenpoint, County Down
Carrowdore Primary School, Newtownards, County Down
Carrowreagh Primary School, Ballymoney, County Antrim
Carrs Glen Primary School, Belfast, County Antrim
Carryduff Primary School, Carryduff, County Down
Castlecaulfield Primary School, Castlecaulfield, County Tyrone
Castledawson Primary School, Castledawson, County Londonderry
Castle Gardens Primary School, Newtownards, County Down
Castleroe Primary School, Coleraine, County Londonderry
Castlewellan Primary School, Castlewellan, County Down
Cavehill Primary School, Belfast, County Antrim
Central Primary School, Limavady, County Londonderry
Christian Brothers Primary School, Greenpark, County Armagh
Christ The King Primary School, Ballynahinch, County Down
Churchill Primary School, Caledon, County Tyrone
Churchtown Primary School, Cookstown, County Tyrone
Clandeboye Primary School, Bangor, County Down
Clare Primary School, Clare, County Armagh
Clea Primary School, Keady, County Armagh
Cliftonville Primary School, Belfast, County Antrim
Clintyclay Primary School, Dungannon, County Tyrone
Clogher Regional Primary School, Clogher, County Tyrone
Clonalig Primary School, Crossmaglen, County Armagh
Clontifleece Primary School, Warrenpoint, County Down
Clough Primary School, Clogh, County Antrim
Cloughmills Primary School, Cloughmills, County Antrim
Cloughoge Primary School, Newry, County Down
Coagh Primary School, Coagh, County Tyrone
Collone Primary School, Armagh
Comber Primary School, Comber, County Down
Convent of Mercy Primary School, Rostrevor, County Down
Cookstown Primary School, Cookstown, County Tyrone
The Cope Primary School, Loughgall, County Armagh
Corran Primary School, Larne, County Antrim
Cortamlet Primary School, Altnamackin, Newry, County Down
Craigavon Primary School, Gilford, County Down
Cranmore Integrated Primary School, Belfast
Crawfordsburn Primary School, Crawfordsburn, County Down
Creavery Primary School, Antrim
Cregagh Primary School. Belfast, County Down
Creggan Primary School, Randalstown, County Antrim
Crievagh Primary School, Cookstown, County Tyrone
Cross Roads Primary School, Kilrea, County Londonderry
Crumlin Primary School, Crumlin, County Antrim
Culcrow Primary School, Aghadowey, County Londonderry
Cullycapple Primary School, Aghadowey, County Londonderry
Culnady Primary School, Culnady, County Londonderry
Cumran Primary School, Downpatrick, County Down
Currie Primary School, Belfast, County Antrim

D
Damhead Primary School, Coleraine, County Londonderry
Darkley Primary School, Darkley, County Armagh
Derryboy Primary School, Downpatrick, County Down
Derrychrin Primary School, Cookstown, County Tyrone
Derryhale Primary School, Derryhale, County Armagh
Derrylatinee Primary School, Dungannon, County Tyrone
Desertmartin Primary School, Desertmartin, County Londonderry
D.H. Christie Memorial Primary School, Coleraine, County Londonderry
Diamind Primary School, Cullybackey, County Antrim
Dickson Primary School, Lurgan, County Armagh
Doagh Primary School, Doagh, County Antrim
Donacloney Primary School, Donaghcloney, County Down
Donaghey Primary School, Dungannon, County Tyrone
Donaghmore Primary School, Donaghmore, County Tyrone
Donaghadee Primary School, Donaghadee, County Down
Donegall Road Primary School, Belfast, County Antrim
Downpatrick Primary School, Downpatrick, County Down
Downshire Primary School, Hillsborough, County Down
Drelincourt Primary School, Armagh
Dromintee Primary School, Killeavey, County Down
Dromara Primary School, Dromara, County Down
Dromore Central Primary School, Dromore, County Down
Dromore Road Primary School, Warrenpoint, County Down
Drumadonnell Primary School, Ballyroney, County Down
Drumard Primary School, Tamlaght, County Londonderry
Drumgor Primary School, Craigavon, County Armagh
Drumhillery Primary School, Armagh
 Drumrane primary school, County Londonderry  burnfoot
Drumsallen Primary School, Killylea, County Armagh
Dunclug Primary School, Ballymena, County Antrim
Dundela Primary School, Belfast, County Antrim
Dundonald Primary School, Dundonald, County Down
Duneane Primary School, Toome, County Antrim
Dungannon Primary School, Dungannon, County Tyrone
Dunmurry Primary School, Dunmurry, County Antrim
Dunseverick Primary School, Dunseverick, County Antrim

E

Earlview Primary School, Newtownabbey, County Antrim
Ebrington Primary School, Derry, County Londonderry
Eden Primary School, Carrickfergus, County Antrim
Eden Primary School, Ballymoney, County Antrim
Edenbrooke Primary School, Belfast, County Antrim
Edenderry Primary School, Banbridge, County Down
Edenderry Primary School, Portadown, County Armagh
Edendork Primary School, Edendork, County Tyrone
Eglinton Primary School, Eglinton, County Londonderry
Eglish Primary School, Eglish, County Tyrone
Elmgrove Primary School, Belfast, County Antrim
Euston Street Primary School, Belfast, County Down

F

Fair Hill Primary School, Kinallen, County Down
Fairview Primary School, Ballyclare, County Antrim
Fane Street Primary School, Belfast, County Antrim
Finaghy Primary School, Belfast
Fivemiletown Primary School, Fivemiletown, County Tyrone
Foley Primary School, Tassagh, County Armagh
Forge Integrated Primary School, Belfast, County Antrim
Fort Hill Primary School, Lisburn, County Antrim
Forth River School, Belfast, County Antrim
Fourtowns Primary School, Ahoghill, County Antrim

G
Gaelscoil an Damba, Belfast
Gaelscoil an Lonnáin, Belfast
Gaelscoil an tSeanchaí, Magherafelt, County Londonderry
Gaelscoile Bheanna Bóirche, Castlewellan, County Down
Gaelscoil Éadain Mhóir, County Londonderry
Gaelscoil Ghleann Darach, Crumlin, County Antrim
Gaelscoil na bhFál, Belfast
Gaelscoil na mBeann, Kilkeel, County Down
Gaelscoil na Daróige, Derry, County Londonderry
Gaelscoil na gCrann, Omagh, County Tyrone
Gaelscoil na Móna, Belfast
Gaelscoil Mhuire, County Tyrone
Gaelscoil na Spéiríní, Magherafelt, County Londonderry
Gaelscoil Naomh Pádraig, Gortin, County Tyrone
Gaelscoil Phádraig Naofa, County Armagh
Gaelscoil Uí Dhochartaigh, Strabane, County Tyrone
Gaelscoil Uí Néill, Coalisland, County Tyrone
Garryduff Primary School, Ballymoney, County Antrim
Garvagh Primary School, Garvagh, County Londonderry
Gilnahirk Shepherd Primary School, Belfast, County Antrim
Glasswater Primary School, Downpatrick, County Down
Glenann Primary School, Cushendall, County Antrim
Glenarm Primary School, Glenarm, County Antrim
Glengormley Primary School, Glengormley, County Antrim
Glenravel Primary School, Martinstown, County Antrim
Glenwood Primary School, Belfast, County Antrim
Glynn Primary School, Glynn, County Antrim
Good Shepherd Primary School, Derry, County Londonderry
Good Shepherd Primary School, Dunmurry, Belfast, County Antrim
Gorran Primary School, Blackhill, Coleraine, County Londonderry
Gracehill Primary School, Gracehill, County Antrim
Grange Park Primary School, Bangor, County Down
Grange Primary School, Kilkeel, Kilkeel, County Down
Granville Primary School, Granville, County Tyrone
Greyabbey Primary School, Greyabbey, County Down
Greenisland Primary School, Greenisland, County Antrim
Greenwood Primary School, Belfast, County Antrim
Greyabbey Primary School, Newtownards, County Down
Greystone Primary School, Antrim, County Antrim
Groggan Primary School, Randalstown, County Antrim

H
Hamiltonsbawn Primary School, Hamiltonsbawn, County Armagh
Harding Memorial Primary School, Belfast, County Down
Hardy Memorial Primary School, Richhill, County Armagh
Harmony Primary School, Belfast, County Antrim
Harmony Hill Primary School, Lisburn, County Antrim
Harpur's Hill Primary School, Coleraine, County Londonderry
Harryville Primary School, Ballymena, County Antrim
Hart Memorial Primary School, Portadown, County Armagh
Hazelbank Primary School, Aughafatten, County Antrim
Hazelwood Integrated Primary School, Newtownabbey, County Antrim
Hezlett Primary School, Castlerock, County Londonderry
Hollybank Primary School, Monkstown, County Antrim
Hollybush Primary School, Derry, County Londonderry
Holy Child Primary School, Belfast, County Antrim
Holy Child Primary School, Derry, County Londonderry
Holy Cross Primary School, Kilkeel, County Down
Holy Evangelists' Primary School, Dunmurry, Belfast, County Antrim
Holy Family Primary School, Derry, County Londonderry
Holy Family Primary School, Teconnaught, Downpatrick, County Down
Holy Family Primary School, Magherafelt, County Londonderry
Holy Rosary School, Belfast, County Antrim
Holy Trinity School, Belfast, County Antrim
Holy Trinity Primary School, Cookstown, County Tyrone
Holywood Primary School, Holywood, County Down
Holywood Rudolf Steiner School, Holywood, County Down 
Howard Primary School & Nursery Unit, Moygashel, County Tyrone

I
Iveagh Primary School, Rathfriland, County Down
Irish Society's Primary School, Coleraine, County Londonderry
Islandmagee Primary School, Islandmagee, County Antrim

J
John Paul II School, Belfast, County Antrim
Jonesborough Primary School, Jonesborough, County Armagh

K
Keady Primary School, Keady, County Armagh
Kells and Connor Primary School, Kells, County Antrim
Kilbride Central Primary School, Kilbride, County Antrim
Kilbroney Primary School, Rostrevor, County Down
Kilcooley Primary School, Bangor, County Down
Kilkeel Primary School, Kilkeel, County Down
Killean Primary School, Newry, County Down
Killinchy Primary School, Killinchy, County Down
Killowen Primary School, Coleraine, County Londonderry
Killowen Primary School, Killowen, County Down
Killowen Primary School, Lisburn, County Antrim
Killylea Primary School, Killylea, County Armagh
Kilmaine Primary School, Bangor, County Down
Killyman Primary School, Dungannon, County Tyrone
Kilmoyle Primary School, Ballymoney, County Antrim
Kilrea Primary School, Kilrea, County Londonderry
Kilross Primary School, Tobermore, County Londonderry
King's Park Primary School, Lurgan, County Armagh
King's Park Primary School, Newtownabbey, County Antrim
Kingsmills Primary School, Whitecross, County Armagh
Kirkinriola Primary School, Ballymena, County Antrim
Kirkistown Primary School, Newtownards, County Down
Knockahollet Primary School, Dunloy, County Antrim
Knockbreda Primary School, Belfast, County Antrim
Knockloughrim Primary School, Knockcloghrim, County Londonderry
Knockmore Primary School, Lisburn, County Antrim
Knocknagin Primary School, Desertmartin, County Londonderry
Knocknagoney School, Belfast, County Antrim

L

Lack Primary School, Lack, County Fermanagh
Laghey Primary School, Killyman, County Tyrone
Landhead Primary School, Ballymoney, County Antrim
Larne and Inver Primary School, Larne, County Antrim
Largymore Primary School, Lisburn, County Antrim
Leadhill Primary School, Belfast/Castlereagh, County Antrim
Leaney Primary School, Ballymoney, County Antrim
Ligoniel School, Belfast, County Antrim
Lisfearty Primary School, Dungannon, County Tyrone
Linn Primary School, Larne, County Antrim
Lisbellaw Primary School, Lisbellaw, County Fermanagh
Lisburn Central Primary School, Lisburn, County Antrim
Lislagan Primary School, Ballymoney, County Antrim
Lisnadill Primary School, Lisnadill, County Armagh
Lisnagelvin Primary School, County Londonderry
Lisnamurrican Primary School, Broughshane, County Antrim
Lisnasharragh Primary School, Belfast, County Down
Lissan Primary School, Cookstown, County Tyrone
Loanends Primary School, Loanends, County Antrim
Londonderry Primary School, Newtownards, County Down
Longstone Primary School, Ahoghill, County Antrim
Loughries Primary School, Newtownards, County Down
Lourdes Primary School, Whitehead, Northern Ireland
Lowwood Primary School, Belfast, County Antrim
Lurgan Model Primary School, Lurgan, County Armagh

M
Mallusk Primary School, Newtownabbey, County Antrim
Maralin Village Primary School, Magheralin, County Down
Markethill Primary School, Markethill, County Armagh
McKinney Primary School, Crumlin, County Antrim
Meadow Bridge Primary School, Hillsborough, County Down
Millington Primary School, Portadown, County Armagh
Millburn Primary School, Coleraine, County Londonderry
Milltown Primary School, Banbridge, County Down
Minterburn Primary School, Caledon, County Tyrone
Model Primary School, Enniskillen, County Fermanagh
Moira Primary School, Moira, County Down
Moneydarragh Primary School, Annalong, County Down
Moneymore Primary School, Moneymore, County Londonderry
Moneyrea Primary School, Moneyreagh, County Down
Moorfields Primary School, Ballymena, County Antrim
Mossgrove Primary School, Glengormley, County Antrim
Mount St Catherine's Primary School, Windmill Hill, Armagh, County Armagh
Mountnorris Primary School, Mountnorris, County Armagh
Mourne Independent Christian School, Kilkeel, County Down
Moyallon Primary School, Craigavon, County Armagh
Moyle Primary School, Larne, County Antrim
Mullaglass Primary School, Mullaghglass, County Armagh
Mullavilly Primary School, Mullavilly, County Armagh

N
Nazareth House Primary School, Derry, County Londonderry
Newcastle Primary School, Newcastle, County Down
Newmills Primary School, Dungannon, County Tyrone
Newtownards Primary School, Newtownards, County Down
Newtownhamilton Primary School, Newtownhamilton, County Armagh
Newtownstewart Model Primary School, Newtownstewart, County Tyrone
Newbuildings Primary School, Newbuildings, County Londonderry

O
Oakfield Primary School, Carrickfergus, County Antrim
Olderfleet Primary School, Larne, County Antrim
Old Warren Primary School, Lisburn, County Antrim
Orangefield Primary School, Belfast, County Antrim
Orritor Primary School, Cookstown, County Tyrone
Our Lady's Primary School, Tullysaran, County Armagh
Our Lady of Lourdes (Park Lodge) Primary School, Belfast, County Antrim
Our Lady Queen Of Peace Primary School, Dunmurry, Belfast, County Antrim

P
Parkhall Primary School, Antrim, County Antrim
Pondnd Park Primary School, Lisburn, County Antrim
Portadown Integrated Primary School, County Armagh
Portadown Independent Christian School, Portadown, County Armagh
Portadown Primary School, Portadown, County Armagh
Portavogie Primary School, Portavogie, County Down
Portstewart Primary School, Portstewart, County Londonderry
Poyntzpass Primary School, Poyntzpass, County Armagh
Presentation Primary School, Portadown, County Armagh
Primate Dixon Primary School, Coalisland, County Tyrone
Portrush Primary School, Portrush, County Antrim
Portglenone primary School, Portglenone, County Antrim

Q
Queen Elizabeth II Primary School, Pomeroy, County Tyrone

R
Rathmore Primary School, Bangor, County Down
Richmount Primary School, Portadown, County Armagh
Riverdale Primary School, Lisburn, County Antrim
Roan Primary School, Eglish, County Tyrone
Rosetta Primary School, Belfast, County Antrim
Rowandale Integrated Primary School, Moira, County Down
Roe Valley Integrated Primary School, Limavady, County Londonderry

S
Sacred Heart Primary School, Rock, County Tyrone
Saints and Scholars Integrated Primary School, County Armagh
Scarva Primary School, Scarva, County Down
Scoil an Droichid, Belfast
Scoil na Fuiseoige, Belfast
Seagoe Primary School, Portadown, County Armagh
Seaview Primary School, Belfast
Seymour Hill Primary School, Dunmurry, Belfast, County Antrim
Spa Primary School, Ballynahinch, County Down
Steelstown Primary School, Derry, County Londonderry
Stewartstown Primary School, Stewartstown, County Tyrone
Straidhavern Primary School, County Antrim
Strandtown Primary School, Belfast
Stranmillis Primary School, Belfast
Sunnylands Primary School, Carrickfergus, County Antrim

St. A
St. Aidan's Primary School, Belfast, County Antrim
St. Aloysius Primary School, Lisburn, County Antrim
St. Anne's Primary School, Finaghy, Belfast, County Antrim
St. Anne's Primary School, Derry, County Londonderry
St. Anthony's Primary School, Craigavon, County Armagh

St. B
St. Bernard's Primary School, Belfast, County Down
St. Bernard's Primary School, Glengormley 
St. Brendan's Primary School, Craigavon, County Armagh
St. Bride's Primary School, Belfast, County Antrim
St. Brigid's Primary School, Augher, County Tyrone
St. Brigid's Primary School, Belleek, County Armagh
St. Brigid's Primary School, Crossmaglen, County Armagh
St. Brigid's Primary School, Downpatrick, County Down
St. Brigid's Primary School, Mountjoy, Brockagh, County Tyrone
St. Brigid's Primary School, Derry, County Londonderry

St. C
St. Canice's Primary School, Fincairn, Feeny, County Londonderry
St. Clare's Convent Primary School, Newry, County Down
St. Colman's Abbey Primary School, Newry, County Down
St. Colman's Primary School, Annaclone, County Down
St. Colman's Primary School, Dromore, County Down
St. Colman's Primary School, Kilkeel, County Down
St. Colman's Primary School, Lawrencetown, County Down
St. Colman's Primary School, Saval, County Down
St. Colum's Primary School, Portstewart, County Londonderry
St. Columbkille's Primary School, Carrickmore, County Tyrone

St. D
St. Dallan's Primary School, Warrenpoint, County Down

St. F
St. Francis of Assisi Primary School, Keady, County Armagh
St. Francis' Primary School, Loughbrickland, County Down

St. I
St Ita's Primary School, Belfast, County Antrim

St. J
St. James' Primary School, Markethill, County Armagh
St. James' Primary Schoole, Tandragee, County Armagh
St. Jarlath's Primary School, Blackwatertown, County Armagh
St. John the Baptist Primary School, Portadown, County Armagh
St. John the Baptist Primary School, Roscor, County Fermanagh
St. John's Primary School, Coalisland, County Tyrone
St. John's Primary School, Gilford, County Down
St. John's Primary School, Middletown, County Armagh
St. John's Primary School, Moy, County Tyrone
St. John's Primary School, Newry, County Down
St. John's Primary School, Portadown, County Armagh
St. John's Primary School, Swatragh, County Londonderry
St. Joseph's Convent Primary School, Newry, County Down
St. Joseph's Primary School, Ballymartin, County Down
St. Joseph's Primary School, Bessbrook, County Armagh
St. Joseph's Primary School, Caledon, County Tyrone
St. Joseph's Primary School, Carryduff, County Down
St. Joseph's Primary School, Cookstown, County Tyrone
St. Joseph's Primary School, Crumlin, County Antrim
St. Joseph's Primary School, Galbally, County Tyrone
St. Joseph's Primary School, Killeavey, County Armagh
St. Joseph's Primary School, Lurgan, County Armagh
St. Joseph's Primary School, Madden, County Armagh
St. Joseph's Primary School, Poyntzpass, County Down

St. K
St Kieran's Primary School, Dunmurry, Belfast, County Antrim
St. Kevin's Primary School, Belfast, County Antrim

St. L
St. Laurence O'Toole's Primary School, Belleek, County Armagh
St Lawrence's Primary School, Fintona, County Tyrone
St Luke's Primary School, Dunmurry, Belfast, County Antrim

St. M 
St. Macartan's Primary school, Loughinisland, Downpatrick
St. MacCartan's Convent Primary School, Clogher, County Tyrone
St. MacNissi's Primary School, Larne, County Antrim
St. Malachy's Primary School, Armagh, County Armagh
St. Malachy's Primary School, Camlough, County Armagh
St. Malachy's Primary School, Carnagat, County Armagh
St. Malachy's Primary School, Kilcoo, County Down 
St. Malachy's Primary School, Moneymore, County Londonderry
St. Malachy's Primary School, Seskilgreen, County Tyrone
St. Malachy's Primary School, Whitecross, County Armagh
St. Mark's Primary School, Belfast, County Antrim
St. Martin's Primary School, Garrison, County Fermanagh
St. Mary's Boys Primary School, Rostrevor, County Down
St. Mary's Primary School, Aughnacloy, Aughnacloy, County Tyrone
St. Mary's Primary School, Ballygawley, County Tyrone
St. Mary's Primary School, Ballyward, County Down
St. Mary's Primary School, Banbridge, County Down
St. Mary's Primary School, Belfast, County Antrim
St. Mary's Primary School, Cabragh, County Tyrone
St. Mary's Primary School, Comber, County Down 
St. Mary's Primary School, Cookstown, County Tyrone
St. Mary's Primary School, Derrymore, County Armagh
St. Mary's Primary School, Derrytrasna, County Armagh
St. Mary's Primary School, Dungannon, County Tyrone
St. Mary's Primary School, Fivemiletown, County Tyrone
St. Mary's Primary School, Glasdrumman, County Down
St. Mary's Primary School, Jerrettspass, County Down
St. Mary's Primary School, Glenview, Maghera, County Londonderry
St. Mary's Primary School, Maghery, County Armagh
St. Mary's Primary School, Mullaghbawn, County Armagh
St. Mary's Primary School, Mullymesker, Arney, Bellanaleck, County Fermanagh
St. Mary's Primary School, Pomeroy, County Tyrone
St. Mary's Primary School, Portglenone, County Antrim
St. Mary's Primary School, Rathfriland, County Down
St. Mary's Primary School, Stewartstown, County Tyrone
St. Mary's Primary School, Saintfield, County Down
St. Mary's Primary School, Tassagh, County Armagh
St. Mary's Primary School, Tempo, County Fermanagh
St. Matthew's Primary School, Ballyward, County Down
St. Michael's Primary School, Finnis, County Down
St. Michael's Primary School, Mowhan, County Armagh
St. Michael's Primary School, Newtownhamilton, County Armagh
St. Mochua's Primary School, Derrynoose, County Armagh

St. N
St. Nicholas' Primary School, Carrickfergus, County Antrim

St. O
St Oliver Plunkett's Primary School, Forkhill, County Armagh
St. Oliver Plunkett's Primary School, Kilmore, County Armagh
St. Oliver's Primary School, Newtownhamilton, County Armagh

St. P
St. Patrick's Primary School, Aghagallon, County Armagh
St. Patrick's Primary School, Annaghmore, County Tyrone
St. Patrick's Primary School, Ardboe, County Tyrone
St. Patrick's Primary School, Armagh, County Armagh
St. Patrick's Primary School, Augher, County Tyrone
St. Patrick's Primary School, Craigavon, County Armagh
St. Patrick's Primary School, Crossmaglen, County Armagh
St. Patrick's Primary School, Cullyhanna, County Armagh
St. Patrick's Primary School, Donaghmore, County Tyrone
St. Patrick's Primary School, Downpatrick, County Down
St. Patrick's Primary School, Dungannon, County Tyrone
St. Patrick's Primary School, Holywood, County Down 
St. Patrick's Primary School, Hilltown, County Down
St. Patrick's Primary School, Loup, County Londonderry
St. Patrick's Primary School, Magheralin, County Down
St. Patrick's Primary School, Mayobridge, County Down
St. Patrick's Primary School, Moneymore, County Londonderry
St. Patrick's Primary School, Mullanaskea, Tempo, County Fermanagh
St. Patrick's Primary School, Newry, County Down
St. Patrick's Primary School, Portrush, County Antrim
St. Patrick's Primary School, Rathfriland, County Down
St. Paul's Primary School, Belfast, County Antrim
St. Paul's Primary School, Cabra, County Down
St. Peter's Primary School, Cloughreagh, County Armagh
St. Peter's Primary School, Charlemont, County Armagh
St. Peter's Primary School, Moortown, County Tyrone

St. R
St. Ronan's Primary School, Newry, County Down

St. T
St. Teresa's Primary School, Belfast, County Antrim
St. Teresa's Primary School, Lurgan, County Armagh
St. Teresa's Primary School, Mountnorris, County Armagh
St. Trea's Primary School, Ballymaguigan, Magherafelt, County Londonderry

St. V
St Vincent De Paul Primary School, Legoniel, County Antrim

T
Tamnamore Primary School, Dungannon, County Tyrone
Tandragee Primary School, Tandragee, County Armagh
Tannaghmore Primary School, Lurgan, County Armagh
Taughmonagh Primary School, Belfast, County Antrim
Templepatrick Primary School, Templepatrick, County Antrim
Tempo Primary School, Tempo, County Fermanagh
Termoncanice Primary School, Limavady, County Londonderry
Thompson Primary School, Ballyclare, County Antrim
Tildarg Primary School, Ballyclare, County Antrim
Tir-na-Nog Primary School, Ballyclare, County Antrim
Tobermore Primary School, Tobermore, County Londonderry
Tonagh Primary School, Lisburn, County Down
Toreagh Primary School, Larne, County Antrim
Towerview Primary School, Bangor, County Down
Tullycarnet Primary School, Belfast, County Down
Tullygally Primary School, Lurgan, County Armagh
Tullymacarette Primary School, Dromore, County Down
Tullyroan Primary School, Dungannon, County Tyrone

U
Upper Ballyboley Primary School, Ballyclare, County Antrim

V
Victoria Park Primary School, Belfast, County Antrim
Victoria Primary School, Ballyhalbert, County Down
Victoria Primary School, Carrickfergus, County Antrim
Victoria Primary School, Newtownards

W
Walker Memorial Primary School, Dungannon, County Tyrone
Waringstown Primary School, Waringstown, County Down
West Winds Primary School, Newtownards, County Down
Wheatfield Primary School, Belfast, County Antrim
Whiteabbey Primary School, Jordanstown, County Antrim
Whitehead Primary School, Whitehead, County Antrim
Whitehouse Primary School, Newtownabbey, County Antrim
Windmill Integrated Primary School, Dungannon, County Tyrone
Windsor Hill Primary School, Newry, County Down
Woodburn Primary School, Carrickfergus, County Antrim
Woodlawn Primary School, Carrickfergus, County Antrim
Woods Primary School, Magherafelt, County Londonderry

References 
Schools Web Directory

Primary schools
 
Northern Ireland